Ignatius Ekwunife (born 20 April 1990 in Onitsha, Anambra State) is a footballer, who plays for Bayelsa United.

Career
Ekwunife began his career with Ocean Boys F.C. and joined in 2008 to Zamfara United F.C., after one year with Zamfara signed for Bayelsa United.

References 

1990 births
Living people
Sportspeople from Onitsha
Nigerian footballers
Association football midfielders
Ocean Boys F.C. players
Zamfara United F.C. players